Liostomia clavula is a species of sea snail, a marine gastropod mollusc in the family Pyramidellidae, the pyrams and their allies.

Description
The thin, white shell is transparent and polished. Its length measures 2.5 mm. The surface is microscopically longitudinally striated. The 4-5 whorls of the teleoconch are rather convex. The suture is slightly margined. The umbilicus is very small and narrow, but distinct. The columella has a barely discernible tooth or fold.

Distribution
This species occurs in the following locations:
 European waters (ERMS scope)
 United Kingdom Exclusive Economic Zone
 Greek Exclusive Economic Zone
 Scandinavia
 North and Central Atlantic Ocean.

Notes
Additional information regarding this species:
 Spelling: Liostomia clavulus in ERMS 1.0

References

External links
 To Biodiversity Heritage Library (9 publications)
 To CLEMAM
 To Encyclopedia of Life
 To GenBank
 To World Register of Marine Species
 

Pyramidellidae
Gastropods described in 1846